The 1909 Cork Intermediate Hurling Championship was the inaugural staging of the Cork Intermediate Hurling Championship since its establishment by the Cork County Board. The championship began on 1 August 1909 and ended on 31 October 1909.

On 31 October 1909, Carrigtwohill won the championship following a 3-15 to 2-00 defeat of Bandon in the final at the Cork Athletic Grounds.

Results

Final

References

Cork Intermediate Hurling Championship
Cork Intermediate Hurling Championship